Nathan Lowe (born 18 September 2005) is an English professional footballer who plays as a forward for Stoke City.

Club career
Lowe was born in Harlow and played youth football for Bishop's Stortford before his family moved to Cheshire where he attended Lymm High School. He played for Egerton before joining the Stoke City academy in May 2016. Lowe signed a professional contract on his 17th Birthday in September 2022. Lowe made his senior debut on 18 February 2023 in a 1–0 defeat away at Blackpool.

Career statistics

References

2005 births
Living people
English footballers
Stoke City F.C. players
Association football forwards
English Football League players